The following is the discography of Sepultura, a Brazilian heavy metal band. Sepultura was formed in Belo Horizonte, Minas Gerais, in 1984 by brothers Max and Igor Cavalera. After several lineup changes, Paulo Jr. and Jairo Guedz became permanent members for the band's first studio album Morbid Visions, released in 1986 through Cogumelo Records. Guitarist Jairo Guedz left Sepultura following the band's first tour and was replaced by Andreas Kisser. With the new lineup, Sepultura recorded Schizophrenia in 1987. Beneath the Remains, the first album from the band's contract with Roadrunner Records, was released in 1989, followed by Arise in 1991 and Chaos A.D. in 1993. Sepultura's best-selling album Roots, was released in 1996 and debuted at number 27 on the Billboard 200.

In 1996, vocalist Max Cavalera left the band and formed Soulfly. The other members announced that they would continue under the Sepultura name and were searching for a replacement. Derrick Green was chosen to replace Cavalera, and with the new vocalist the band released Against in 1998. Nation was released in 2001, the band's last studio album with Roadrunner Records. Sepultura signed to German label SPV and released Roorback. Dante XXI was released in 2006 as a concept album inspired by the literary classic Divine Comedy by Dante Alighieri. Igor Cavalera left the band in 2006 and was replaced by Jean Dolabella. In 2009 Sepultura released A-Lex, a concept album about A Clockwork Orange, followed by 2011's Kairos. Drummer Eloy Casagrande replaced Dollabella and in 2013 the band released The Mediator Between Head and Hands Must Be the Heart, which was loosely based on sci-fi film Metropolis. In 2017, Sepultura released their fourteenth studio album Machine Messiah, and followed this in 2020 with their fifteenth studio album Quadra.

Studio albums

Live albums

Compilation albums

Extended plays

LP

Singles

Video albums 

1.Billboard Top Music Video Charts.

Music videos

Notes

References

External links 

 
[ Sepultura] at Allmusic
Sepultura at Discogs

Sepultura
Heavy metal group discographies
Discographies of Brazilian artists